Andy Schoettle (August 17, 1933 – November 24, 2010) was an American sailor. He competed in the 5.5 Metre event at the 1956 Summer Olympics.  He graduated from Princeton University and Harvard Law School.

References

External links
 

1933 births
2010 deaths
American male sailors (sport)
Olympic sailors of the United States
Sailors at the 1956 Summer Olympics – 5.5 Metre
Sportspeople from Philadelphia
Princeton University alumni
Harvard Law School alumni